Tom Sawyer (born April 15, 1958) is an American politician who served as the minority leader of the Kansas House of Representatives. A Democrat, Sawyer has represented the 95th district, covering southwest Wichita, since 2013. Sawyer previously represented the same district from 1987 to 1999 and from 2003 to 2009, serving as both Majority Leader and Minority Leader during his first stint in the legislature.

Kansas House career
Born in Wichita, Kansas, Sawyer graduated from Wichita State University with a BBA in Accounting in 1984. Sawyer was first elected to the Kansas House of Representatives two years later in 1986. He became the party's House Leader, and through his initial 12-year legislative career served as both the Majority Leader and the Minority Leader. He is only the fourth Democrat to ever be elected Majority Leader of the Kansas House and the only Wichitan to hold that position in the last 30 years.

After leaving the legislature for an unsuccessful run for Governor of Kansas in 1998, Sawyer served as State Chairman of the Kansas Democratic Party for four years before being once again elected to the state legislature in 2002. He was re-elected in 2004, 2006 and 2008, and served as chair of the Sedgwick County Legislative Delegation in 2005. He resigned from the House of Representatives in 2009 to serve on the state Parole Board.

Following the election of Republican Governor Sam Brownback in 2010, Sawyer left the Parole Board and in 2012 once again won election to the state House, defeating a Republican incumbent and returning to his position as the representative for the 95th district.

1998 gubernatorial campaign

In 1998, Sawyer opted to run for Governor of Kansas to prevent controversial Westboro Baptist Church preacher Fred Phelps from obtaining the Democratic nomination. Though he won the primary in a landslide, Sawyer was defeated badly in the general election, losing all 105 counties and winning just 23% of the vote against popular incumbent Republican governor Bill Graves.

References

External links
Official Campaign Site
Project Vote Smart profile
Kansas Votes profile
Campaign contributions: 1998, 2002, 2004, 2006, 2008

|-

1958 births
20th-century American politicians
21st-century American politicians
Candidates in the 1998 United States elections
Democratic Party members of the Kansas House of Representatives
Living people
Politicians from Wichita, Kansas
State political party chairs of Kansas
Wichita State University alumni